Hypnomonadaceae is a family of green algae, in the order Chlamydomonadales.

References

Chlorophyceae families
Chlamydomonadales